Brides is an American website published by Dotdash Meredith, who purchased the title in 2019. As with many similar bridal magazines, it is designed to be an in-depth resource for brides-to-be, with many photographs and articles on wedding dresses, cakes, ceremonies, receptions, and honeymoons. It was the sister publication of Modern Bride and Elegant Bride magazines, until the demise of those titles in October 2009. Then, the frequency of Brides changed to monthly. The magazine was published monthly until 2013 when the frequency was switched to bimonthly.

A spinoff, Brides Local magazines, began publishing in 2006; these local companion magazines were published and sold in 16 regional areas of the United States. The local magazines were shuttered in 2011. In May 2019 the magazine was sold to Dotdash, part of Barry Diller’s IAC Corp, which ceased publication of the print version and began to focus on digital platforms.

Topics covered
Brides magazine contains many topics that are of interest to brides and their bridal party. The magazine contains information on bridal party dresses, bouquets, wedding paperwork, engagement rings, alterations, fitness, budgeting, shoes, cosmetics, hairstyles, fashion accessories, and fashions.

References

External links
 Brides.com
 Bridesmagazine.co.uk

Bimonthly magazines published in the United States
Monthly magazines published in the United States
Online magazines published in the United States
Weekly magazines published in the United States
Defunct Condé Nast magazines
Defunct women's magazines published in the United States
Magazines established in 1934
Magazines disestablished in 2019
Online magazines with defunct print editions